Era 4.0 is the fourth studio album by the French gothic metal band Penumbra, released on November 27, 2015 under their own record label.

It represented a return to the recording studio for the band after 12 years of absence.

Track listing 
All songs written by Jarlath (Maxime Meheust).
 "New Era" (01:58)
 "Insane?" (02:43) 
 "Charon" (04:02)
 "Save My World" (04:44)
 "Exhumed" (04:21)
 "Insidious" (04:03)
 "Eerie Shelter" (05:32)
 "Before Oblivion" (04:54)
 "Avalon" (04:26)
 "Malice in Wonderland" (03:27)

Personnel

Penumbra 
 Jarlaath - Vocals, Keyboards, Lyrics
 Agone - Bass, Vocals (backing)
 Neo - Guitars
 Arathelis - Drums
 Loic - Guitars
 Asphodel - Vocals
 Zoltan - Keyboards, Orchestrations

Additional musicians 
 Tatiana Probst,  Amelie Robins - Vocals (soprano)
 Cecile Meltzer - Vocals (mezzo-soprano)
 Guilhem Souyri - Baritone
 Pierre Bessiere - Bass
 Thomas D'Arbigny - Guitars and bass (additional)
 Loic Taillebrest -  Bagpipes

Production 
 Mario Sanchez Nevado - Artwork, Design
 Julien Portrat	- Recording, Mixing
 Xavier Robin - Recording, Mixing
 Jens Bogren - Mastering
 Pablo de Selva - Photography

References

External links 
 Metallum Archives
 Discogs.com

2015 albums
Penumbra (band) albums